Denís Alfredo Milar Otero (born August 20, 1952) is a former Uruguayan football forward, who played for the Uruguay national team between 1973 and 1979, gaining 19 caps and scoring 4 goals. He was part of the Uruguay squad for the 1974 World Cup.

At club level, Milar played for Liverpool, Granada and Nacional.

External links
 
 

1952 births
Footballers from Montevideo
Uruguayan footballers
Uruguayan expatriate footballers
Association football forwards
Uruguay international footballers
1974 FIFA World Cup players
1979 Copa América players
Liverpool F.C. (Montevideo) players
Granada CF footballers
Club Nacional de Football players
Expatriate footballers in Spain
Living people